Pim Island (previously Bedford Pim Island) is located off the eastern coast of Ellesmere Island, part of the Qikiqtaaluk Region of the Canadian territory of Nunavut. Located within the Arctic Archipelago, it is a part of the Queen Elizabeth Islands.

Pim Island is separated from Ellesmere Island by Rice Strait, the waterway that connects Rosse Bay to the south and Buchanan Bay to the north. Nares Strait is to the east.

History
The Adolphus Greely expedition wintered at Camp Clay in 1883, and in 1884, Cape Sabine was the rescue site for Greely and the Lady Franklin Bay Expedition.

References

External links
 Pim Island in the Atlas of Canada - Toporama; Natural Resources Canada

Islands of the Queen Elizabeth Islands
Islands of Baffin Bay
Uninhabited islands of Qikiqtaaluk Region